Uzana (also known as Sithu III; 1213–1256) was king of Pagan dynasty of Burma (Myanmar) from 1251 to 1256. He assumed the regnal name "Śrī Tribhuvanāditya Dhammarājajayasūra" (ၐြီတြိဘုဝနာဒိတျဓမ္မရာဇဇယသူရ).

Although his actual reign lasted only five years, Uzana was essentially the power behind the throne during his predecessor Kyaswa's reign, 1235–1251. Kyaswa, a devout Buddhist and scholar, had given Uzana full royal authority to govern the kingdom to the business of governing the country. However Uzana reportedly cared more about chasing elephants, and drinking liquor than governing during his father's or his reign. As king, he left the task of governing to his chief minister Yazathingyan. The king was accidentally killed at Dala (modern Twante) in May 1256 while hunting elephants.

His death was followed by a brief power struggle for the throne. His eldest son, Thihathu, claimed the throne but was pushed aside by the court led by Yazathingyan, who placed the other son by a concubine, Narathihapate, on the throne by November 1256.

Dates
The table below lists the dates given by the four main chronicles.

According to inscriptional evidence, he died a few days before 6 May 1256 when the Pagan selected his younger son by a concubine Narathihapate as the next king.

Notes

References

Bibliography
 
 
 
 
 
 
 
 
 

Pagan dynasty
1213 births
1256 deaths
13th-century Burmese monarchs